The Savage Seven is a 1968 outlaw biker exploitation film directed by Richard Rush, who had directed the previous year's Hells Angels on Wheels. Rush agreed to direct The Savage Seven in exchange for the opportunity to make the psychedelic film Psych-Out.

Penny Marshall appears in one of her earliest screen roles.

Plot
Kisum, the leader of a motorcycle gang, is in love with waitress Marcia Little Hawk. Her brother Johnnie Little Hawk, the leader of a group of Indians, is upset about the romance. The bikers and Indians join forces but a scheme by crooked businessmen causes them to become adversaries.

Cast

 Robert Walker Jr. as Johnnie
 Joanna Frank as Marcia
 John Garwood as Stud
 Larry Bishop as Joint
 Adam Roarke as Kisum
 Max Julien as Grey Wolf
 Richard Anders as Bull
 Duane Eddy as Eddie
 Billy "Green" Bush as Seely
 Penny Marshall as Tina

Reception
In a contemporary review for The New York Times, critic Richard F. Shepard wrote: "The movie is one continuous uproar of unmuffled motors and head-cracking and emphasized cruelty from one and to another. It is colorful and technically competent but completely cheap in its primitive, uninquiring, kick'-em-in-the-groin sensationalism, too serious to be lusty and too one-note to be interesting."

Several critics consider the film to be a biker film adaptation of Akira Kurosawa's 1954 classic Seven Samurai.

Soundtrack
 
The film's soundtrack album was released 1968 on Atco Records as 33-245 (mono) and SD-33-245 (stereo).

References

External links 
 
 
 

1968 films
1960s action thriller films
1960s crime drama films
1960s exploitation films
American International Pictures films
American action thriller films
American crime drama films
American exploitation films
1960s English-language films
Films about Native Americans
Films directed by Richard Rush
Films scored by Jerry Styner
Outlaw biker films
1960s American films